The 2012–13 Belgian Basketball Cup was the 59th season of the annual basketball cup tournament in Belgium. BC Oostende won its 13th title, by beating Okapi Aalstar 77–76 in the Final. Matt Lojeski was the cup's MVP.

Bracket

References

Belgian Basketball Cup
Cup